Teemore is a townland in County Fermanagh, Northern Ireland, three miles south of Derrylin. In the 2001 Census it had a population of four hundred people. It is situated within the Fermanagh and Omagh District Council area.

Places of interest 
The official opening of the Shannon-Erne Waterway took place at Corraguil Lock, near Teemore on 23 May 1994.

See also 
 List of townlands in County Fermanagh
 List of villages in Northern Ireland
 List of towns in Northern Ireland

References 
 NI Neighbourhood Information System

External links 

Villages in County Fermanagh
Townlands of County Fermanagh